James Paige Morrison (born April 21, 1954) is an American actor best known for his portrayal of CTU Director Bill Buchanan on 24.

Life and career
Morrison was born in Bountiful, Utah, the son of an office manager, and was raised in Anchorage, Alaska. A professional theater actor, Morrison has been on the professional stage since the early 1980s and has won awards such as the Los Angeles Drama Critics Circle Award for Outstanding Performance. He has also directed theater productions. Morrison is a published poet, yoga teacher, and a singer-songwriter. He has composed two albums to date, which can be heard and purchased on his official website.

On television, Morrison has guest-starred in series such as Law and Order SVU, Frasier, Quantum Leap, The X-Files, The West Wing and Six Feet Under. Morrison frequently works with producers Glen Morgan and James Wong, and was a main cast member of their 1995 series Space: Above and Beyond. He also worked with Wong in the movie The One as hero Jet Li's best friend.

He portrayed Counter Terrorist Unit Director Bill Buchanan on 24. He began as a guest star midway through the fourth season (2005), and was a main cast member in the fifth, sixth, and seventh seasons (2006, 2007, 2009).

His plays have been developed by the Sundance Institute (Idle Wheels) and the Ojai Playwrights Conference (his one-man play, Leave Your Fears Here).

Morrison and his wife, Riad Galayini, co-directed and produced the feature documentary Showing Up. The documentary examines the audition process, with working actors reflecting on the process and how it affects them, including: Kristin Chenoweth, Richard Griffiths, Zoe Kazan, Nathan Lane, Chris Messina, Sam Rockwell, Bill Irwin and Eli Wallach.

Filmography

Actor

Producer

Director

Writer

Awards and nominations

References

External links
 
 
 
 
 

1954 births
Living people
American atheists
American male stage actors
American male television actors
Male actors from Anchorage, Alaska
Male actors from Utah
People from Bountiful, Utah